Stewart Phillip "Frank" Abbott (6 July 1885 – 4 August 1947) was an Australian rules footballer who played with Fitzroy. In between his two stints for Fitzroy, he played for Essendon Town in the VFA.

References

External links

Frank Abbott's playing statistics from The VFA Project

1885 births
Australian rules footballers from Melbourne
Fitzroy Football Club players
Essendon Association Football Club players
1947 deaths
People from Fitzroy, Victoria